The West Indies cricket team were scheduled to tour Australia in October 2020 to play three Twenty20 International (T20I) matches. On 28 May 2020, Cricket Australia confirmed the fixtures for the series. Originally the matches would have been used as warm-up fixtures for the 2020 ICC Men's T20 World Cup. However, in July 2020, the International Cricket Council (ICC) postponed the T20 World Cup until 2021 due to the COVID-19 pandemic. In August 2020, the three T20I matches were also postponed due to the pandemic, and a fixture clash with the revised schedule for the 2020 Indian Premier League.

T20I series

1st T20I

2nd T20I

3rd T20I

References

External links
 Series home at ESPN Cricinfo

2020 in Australian cricket
2020 in West Indian cricket
International cricket competitions in 2020–21
2020-21
Cricket events postponed due to the COVID-19 pandemic